Mister Ten Per Cent is a 1967 British comedy film directed by Peter Graham Scott and starring Charlie Drake, Derek Nimmo and Wanda Ventham.

It was shot at Elstree Studios and on location in London. It was the last in a series of four films produced by ABPC featuring Drake.

Plot
Percy Pointer, a construction worker and amateur dramatist, writes a drama 'Oh My Lord' and hopes to have it professionally produced. A dishonest producer agrees to back the play, hoping that it will be a disaster, so that he can claim insurance on its failure. To Percy's distress, the first audience see the play as a slapstick comedy, not the drama he intended it to be.

The play is a hit and audiences love it. But Percy is upset by the turn of events and attempts to ruin the production. It then emerges that in his ignorance of showbusiness contracts, he has signed away 10% of any revenue to so many people that he actually owes 110% of the money.

His attempts to sabotage the production lead to his being banned from the theatre. But with great resourcefulness, he manages to enter the theatre backstage and create havoc. With the audience thinking this is a part of the comedy and hugely enjoying it, Percy takes to the stage and addresses the audience, asking them why they find his drama so funny. No-one can find an answer, but they cheer him anyway.

The last scene, with chaos backstage, owes much to the Marx Brothers film, A Night at the Opera (1935).

The sleeve notes of the 2014 DVD release of the film open with the words "Predating Mel Brooks The Producers by a year...", drawing attention to the uncanny resemblance between the plots of the two films.

Cast
 Charlie Drake as Percy Pointer
 Derek Nimmo as Tony
 Wanda Ventham as Kathy
 John Le Mesurier as Jocelyn Macauley
 Anthony Nicholls as Casey
 Noel Dyson as Mrs. Gorman
 John Hewer as Townsend
 Anthony Gardner as Claude Crepe
 Ronald Radd as Publicity Man
 John Laurie as Scotsman
 Colin Douglas as Policeman
 Annette Andre as Muriel
 Justine Lord as Lady Dorothea
 George Baker as Lord Edward
 Joyce Blair as 1st Lady Dorothea
 Una Stubbs as 2nd Lady Dorothea
 Nicole Shelby as Fiona
 Gina Warwick as Ellen
 Percy Herbert as Inspector Great
 Desmond Roberts as Manservant
 Colin Douglas as Policeman
 Lyn Ashley as the Maid
 Roy Beck as Theater-Goer
 Pauline Chamberlain as Woman in Theatre Audience
 Carol Cleveland as Girl at Theatre Party
 Valerie Van Ost as Girl at Theatre Party

References

External links
 

1967 films
British comedy films
1967 comedy films
Films shot at Associated British Studios
Films directed by Peter Graham Scott
Films with screenplays by Norman Hudis
Films scored by Ron Goodwin
Films set in London
Films shot in London
1960s English-language films
1960s British films